Goldie (born 1965) is a British musician (real name Clifford Price).

Goldie may also refer to:

People
 Goldie (given name)
 Goldie (surname)
 Goldie (nickname)

Stage name or ring name
 Goldie Hill (1933–2005), American country music singer
 Genya Ravan, lead singer of Goldie and the Gingerbreads
 Goldie Ray, later stage name for Ursula Hayden (born 1966)
 Goldie Rogers, ring name of former professional wrestler David Sherwin (1950–2012)
 Goldie Semple (1952–2009), Canadian actress

In entertainment
 Goldie (band), a British band
 "Goldie" (song), a 2012 single by ASAP Rocky
 Goldie, Dickey Betts' 1957 Gibson Les Paul Goldtop guitar
 Goldie (DC Comics), a comic book character in Neil Gaiman's The Sandman
 Goldie (film) (1931), starring Spencer Tracy
 Goldie Wilson and Goldie Wilson III, characters from the movies Back to the Future and Back to the Future Part II
 Goldie, a character in the children's movie Rock-a-Doodle
 Goldie O'Gilt, a Disney character in the Donald Duck universe
 Goldie, a fictional character in the British web series Corner Shop Show
 Goldie Foxx, animated keyboardist of the virtual band Studio Killers

Other uses
 Cape Goldie, a cape in Antarctica
 Goldie (Cambridge University Boat Club), Cambridge University Boat Club's reserve crew
 Goldie (dog), one of the "pets" on the British children's TV series Blue Peter
 Goldie (eagle), that made a famous escape from the London Zoo in 1965

See also
 Golde Flami, Argentine actress 
 Golden (disambiguation)
 Goldy (disambiguation)
 John Senhouse Goldie-Taubman, Manx politician